Alexandre Mouton (November 19, 1804 – February 12, 1885) was a United States senator and the 11th Governor of Louisiana.

Early life

He was born in Attakapas district (now Lafayette Parish) into a wealthy plantation-owning Acadian family. He pursued classical studies and graduated from Georgetown College. He studied law, was admitted to the bar in 1825, and commenced practice in Lafayette Parish.  He married Zelia Rousseau, the granddaughter of Governor Jacques Dupré, in 1826; they had 5 children before her death in 1837, one of whom died in infancy. In 1842, he married Emma Kitchell Gardner; this marriage produced eight children, six of whom survived to adulthood.

Political career
From 1827 to 1832 was a member of the Louisiana House of Representatives, serving as speaker in 1831 - 1832. He was a presidential elector on the Democratic ticket in 1828, 1832, and 1836, and was an unsuccessful candidate for election in 1830 to the Twenty-second Congress. In 1836 he was again a member of the State house of representatives.

Mouton was elected as a Democrat to the U.S. Senate to fill the vacancy caused by the resignation of Alexander Porter, was reelected to the full term, and served from January 12, 1837, until his resignation on March 1, 1842. While in the Senate he was chairman of the Committee on Agriculture (Twenty-sixth Congress).

From 1843 to 1846, Mouton was governor of Louisiana. As governor, Mouton reduced expenditures and liquidated state assets to balance the budget and meet bond obligations without raising taxes. He sold state-owned steamboats, equipment and slaves used to remove the Red River Raft in 1834 under Governor Roman. As governor, he opposed all expenditures for internal improvements. He leased out state penitentiary labor and equipment. He supported the call for a constitutional convention, removal of property qualifications for suffrage and office holding, and the election of all local officials and most judges.

Civil War

He was president of the State secession convention in 1861 and an unsuccessful candidate to the Confederate Senate. Actively involved in railroads, he was president of the Southwestern Railroad Convention.

He was an active supporter of the Confederacy, devoting a large amount of his wealth to the cause. His son Alfred Mouton became a general and died at the Battle of Mansfield. His daughter married Confederate Major General Franklin Gardner, whose older sister became his own second wife.

Death

He died near Vermillionville (now Lafayette) in 1885. He is buried in the cemetery at St. John's Cathedral.

References

Congressional Bioguide's Guide to Research Collections for Alexander Mouton
National Governors Association

External links

Painting of Governor Mouton's home
State of Louisiana -  Biography
Cemetery Memorial by La-Cemeteries

1804 births
1885 deaths
Acadian people
American people of Acadian descent
Acadian history
Cajun people
Democratic Party governors of Louisiana
Speakers of the Louisiana House of Representatives
Democratic Party members of the Louisiana House of Representatives
1828 United States presidential electors
1832 United States presidential electors
1836 United States presidential electors
American Roman Catholics
Georgetown University alumni
Democratic Party United States senators from Louisiana
Louisiana Jacksonians